Toronto Northwest was an Ontario provincial electoral district that existed from 1914 to 1926. It occupied an area north of College and Gerrard between Lansdowne and Spadina. In 1926 there was a major redistribution of Ontario seats which resulted in Toronto Northwest being split between five new ridings called from west to east, Brockton, Dovercourt, Bellwoods, St. Andrew, and St. Patrick.

The riding was a dual riding in that it elected two members to the Ontario provincial legislature.

Boundaries
In 1914 the riding was parts of the Toronto North and Toronto West ridings. It bordered College Street, Lansdowne Avenue on the west, Spadina Avenue on the east and the city limits to the north.

In 1926 there was a major redistribution of Ontario seats which resulted in Toronto Northwest being split between the new ridings of Brockton, Dovercourt, Bellwoods, St. Andrew, and St. Patrick.

Members of Provincial Parliament

Election results
Elections were run as separate races for Seat A and Seat B rather than a combined race.

Seat A

Seat B

References

Notes

Citations

Former provincial electoral districts of Ontario
Provincial electoral districts of Toronto